CEMP may refer to:

Central–Eastern Malayo-Polynesian languages
Convention on the Conservation of Antarctic Marine Living Resources Ecosystem Monitoring Programme